Mar Joseph Perumthottam (born 5 July 1948) is a prelate of the Syro-Malabar Catholic Church. Since 2007 he as served as the Archbishop of Changanassery.

Education

He was educated in St. Joseph's High School in Punnathura and St. Berchmans' College in Changanassery. He completed his seminary studies at St. Thomas Petit Seminary, Changanassery and St. Thomas Apostolic Seminary, Vadavathoor, Kottayam.

On 18 December 1974 he was ordained priest by Archbishop Mar Joseph Powathil, then auxiliary Bishop of Changanacherry. After his ministry as assistant parish priest for a few years he was appointed in 1979 as Director of Sandesanilayam, the Catechetical Centre of the Archdiocese and Chaplain of Catholic Workers' Movement of the Archdiocese. In the Catechetical field, he introduced many training programmes, including Catechetical Leaders' Training (CLT), which is being continued to this day by Sandesanilayam.

In 1983 he was sent for higher studies, at Gregorian University Rome where he took doctorate in Church History. Back from Rome, in 1989 he was appointed professor of St. Thomas Apostolic Seminary Vadavathoor and Missionary Orientation Centre, Manganam, Kottayam and vicar of St. Sebastian's Church, Kodinattumkunnu. During this period he was instrumental in starting Marthoma Vidyanikethan at Changanacherry, the higher institute of religious sciences for the laity at the initiative and active support of Archbishop Mar Joseph Powathil. This institute is a unique venture affiliated to Paurastya Vidyapitam, Vadavthoor, conferring P.G. degree recognized by the Congregation for Catholic Education, Rome and Joseph Perumthottam has been at its helm for the last one decade.

Simultaneously he has been vicar of Mar Sleeba Church, Ponga. He was nominated auxiliary bishop on 24 April 2002 and was consecrated by Archbishop Mar Joseph Powathil at St. Mary's Metropolitan Church, Changanacherry, on 20 May 2002, the 116th anniversary of the Archdiocese.

Bishop Perumthottam was appointed Archbishop of Changanassery on 22 January 2007 and he assumed charge on 19 March 2007.

References

External links

1948 births
Living people
21st-century Eastern Catholic archbishops
Pontifical Gregorian University alumni
Archbishops of Changanassery
People from Kottayam district